Christopher Perkins (born 9 January 1974) is an English former footballer who played in the Football League for Chesterfield, Hartlepool United, Lincoln City and Mansfield Town.

Playing career
Perkins started his football career at Mansfield Town before joining Chesterfield in 1994. He went on to make over 150 appearances for the Spireites. During his time at Saltergate, Perkins found himself playing in the famous F.A Cup run during the 1996–97 season. He joined Hartlepool United in 1999, however he soon re-joined Chesterfield on loan, then permanently before ending his professional career with Lincoln City. He went on to play for non-league sides Stalybridge Celtic, Lancaster City, Rossendale United and Chorley.

Later career
After finishing as a full-time professional, Perkins became a sports marketing manager for Reebok UK in September of 2002. He then became an account manager for Scout7 in 2008, then was a sports marketing manager for the adidas group from September 2008 to November 2014.

References

1974 births
Living people
English footballers
Association football midfielders
Mansfield Town F.C. players
Chesterfield F.C. players
Hartlepool United F.C. players
Lincoln City F.C. players
Stalybridge Celtic F.C. players
Lancaster City F.C. players
Rossendale United F.C. players
Chorley F.C. players
English Football League players
Footballers from Nottingham
Tottenham Hotspur F.C. non-playing staff